Lieutenant General Sir Geoffrey Stuart Thompson  (6 January 1905 – 15 November 1983) was a senior British Army officer who became Military Secretary.

Military career
Thompson was born as the youngest of three sons in Wokingham, Berkshire, in 1905, the son of Brigadier-General William Arthur Murray Thompson and his wife, Henrietta Rickman. He was educated at the Royal Naval College, Osborne and Britannia Royal Naval College before going to the Royal Military Academy, Woolwich. After passing out from Woolwich, Thompson was commissioned into the Royal Artillery on 28 January 1925.

He served in World War II and from 1942 was attached the French Forces in the Middle East. In 1944 he was made Commanding Officer of 1st Field Regiment in Italy. He took part in the liberation of Athens in 1945.

In 1945 Winston Churchill ordered the planning of "Operation Unthinkable", to launch an offensive against the Soviet Forces after the defeat of Germany to wrest Eastern Europe from the Soviet Union. Thompson was asked to create a plan to push back the Soviet Forces into Poland. The plan could only muster some 47 UK and US Divisions against 170 Soviet ones and controversially sought to rearm Wehrmacht and SS troops to close the gap. Widespread opposition from the UK Chiefs of Staff eventually saw it shelved.

He later became Chief of Staff at Anti-Aircraft Command and then, from 1950, Commander of No. 2 Army Group Royal Artillery in Egypt. He was appointed Director of Land/Air Warfare and Director of NATO Standardisation at the War Office in 1952 and went on to be Senior Army Instructor at the Imperial Defence College in 1955. He was appointed Director of Staff Duties at the War Office in 1957 and Military Secretary in 1959. He retired in 1961.

He was also Colonel Commandant of the Royal Artillery from 1961 to 1969.

In retirement he became a Director of Arthur Guinness, Son & Co. (Dublin) Limited.

References

External links
Generals of World War II

 

1905 births
1983 deaths
Military personnel from Berkshire
Graduates of Britannia Royal Naval College
People educated at the Royal Naval College, Osborne
People educated at Sherborne School
Graduates of the Royal Military Academy, Woolwich
British Army lieutenant generals
British Army brigadiers of World War II
Royal Artillery officers
Anti-Aircraft Command officers
Knights Commander of the Order of the British Empire
Companions of the Order of the Bath
Companions of the Distinguished Service Order
People of the Greek Civil War